A Mother's Devotion is a 1966 Soviet drama film directed by Mark Donskoy.

Plot 
The film takes place in 1900-1917. The film tells about a woman who begins to understand that her children will become her faithful followers, so she becomes stronger.

Cast 
 Nina Menshikova
 Rodion Nakhapetov
 Gennadi Chertov
 Yuriy Solomin
 Tamara Loginova
 Aleksandra Moskalyova	
 Yelmira Kapustina
 Nadezhda Fedosova		
 Viktor Shakhov
 Georgi Yepifantsev

References

External links 
 

1966 films
1960s Russian-language films
Soviet drama films
1966 drama films